Never Never is a two-part British television drama series, created and written by playwright Tony Marchant and starring John Simm and Sophie Okonedo, that first broadcast on Channel 4 on 5 November 2000.

Plot
The series follows John Parlour (Simm), a loanshark who strikes up a friendship with one of clients, single mum Jo Weller (Okonedo), and decides to leave his past behind and open a credit union to help his former clients out of debt; but his former bosses, who strongly disapprove of the idea, try everything to prevent his business from becoming a success.

Production
Marchant's original notion for the series was not to write about poverty, but to produce something that tackled the modern idea of benign entrepreneurs. 'In a curious kind of way, Richard Branson was the starting point. I was interested in this idea of could businesses be ethical? What exactly was the bottom line?'

'It seemed quite timely to explore the difference between setting things up that are supposed to be for the social good but in turn the conflict between that and the need to be a financially successful entity.'

Reception
The series broadcast over two consecutive nights, with the concluding episode following on 6 November 2000. The first episode drew 2.18 million viewers. The series has yet to be released on DVD, but is available to watch on Channel 4's on-demand service All4.

The Bella Review gave the series a positive review, writing: "Never Never, a story written by acclaimed playwright Tony Marchant, is essentially about good people doing bad things and vice versa. It's free from any sort of class judgement that might put you off, elegantly letting people be people. Good tension throughout is created by the "will John become a good person with morals and stuff" question – which is, as it should, left unanswered."

They continued; "There's also great acting, supported by the good writing, allowing for heaps of emotions left unspoken yet blatantly obviously present. Even if the narrative is sometimes predictable to seasoned fiction readers and viewers, this production is essentially too in-your-face-honest and charming to disagree with it. That, and John Simm is just a bit too good to do anything wrong."

Cast
 John Simm as John Parlour
 Sophie Okonedo as Jo Weller
 Adam Kotz as Martin
 Ruth Sheen as Sandra
 Ellen Thomas as Brenda
 Ashley Walters as Lee
 Gerard Horan as Dave Bell
 Michael J. Jackson as Bruce Gayle
 Claudie Blakley as Belinda
 Emma Cooke as Carol
 Leo Dolan as Frank
 Jake Nightingale as Bob 
 Alex Noodle as Max

Episodes

References

External links

2000 British television series debuts
2000 British television series endings
2000s British crime drama television series
2000s British television miniseries
English-language television shows
Channel 4 television dramas
Murder in television
Television series by All3Media
Television shows set in London